Froilan Cruz "Lang" Tenorio (September 9, 1939 – May 4, 2020) was a Northern Mariana Islander politician who was the fourth governor of the Northern Mariana Islands. Elected in 1993, he served one term from January 10, 1994 to January 12, 1998. During his governorship and most of his political career, Tenorio was a member of the Democratic Party of the Northern Mariana Islands, which was not then affiliated with the American Democratic Party. However, he later switched his affiliation to the Covenant Party. As of 2021, he is the last Democrat to serve as governor of the territory.

Background

Education
Tenorio graduated from the Territorial College of Guam in 1962 with an associate's degree before earning a bachelor's degree in civil engineering at Marquette University in 1967.

Early career
Tenorio was subsequently employed by the Los Angeles, California department of public works. In 1972 he was hired by the Micronesian Construction Company. He founded his own construction company two years later.

Tenorio's early career in elective office consisted of one term as a CNMI Senator and three two-year terms as Washington representative. He first ran for governor in 1989. In 1993 he ran again and won.

Governorship

Policies
Tenorio governed as a fiscal conservative in several ways. He warned the legislature against increasing spending without accompanying measures to increase revenue. However, the legislature implemented an earned income credit which was repealed after Tenorio left office because there were not enough funds to pay for it.

Tenorio frequently battled with the Republican-dominated legislature during his term. His first executive order was a sweeping reorganization of the commonwealth government that was contested by both litigation and by the legislature. It was eventually put into effect. The Republican legislature also frequently rejected Tenorio's appointments; Alexandro C. Castro, who was twice Tenorio's Supreme Court nominee, was twice rejected by the legislature. He was later appointed successfully to that court by Tenorio's successor, Pedro P. Tenorio, a Republican.

As Governor, Tenorio was a fierce opponent of federal legislation that would have extended federal minimum wage and immigration laws to the CNMI, which at that time was exempt from those laws. The predominant industry in the CNMI (outside of tourism) was the garment manufacturing industry, which drew chiefly upon female foreign workers, generally from China. These workers were generally paid far less than the minimum wage in the United States and were brought in extensively through the CNMI's immigration system, which differed from that of the United States. Federal legislation signed nearly a decade after Tenorio left office altered the minimum wage regulations and immigration system of the CNMI.

During his term, Tenorio was praised extensively by U.S. Representative Tom DeLay of Texas, including on the House floor in 1997:

DeLay and Tenorio shared strong ties to lobbyist Jack Abramoff, and both would become infamous in the Jack Abramoff CNMI scandal.

Defeat for re-election
In 1997, Tenorio ran for re-election in a three-way race.  Ultimately, the nominee of the Republican Party, former governor Pedro P. Tenorio, won the election easily with 45.6% of the vote. Democratic support was split between Governor Tenorio and his Lieutenant Governor, Jesus C. Borja.  Tenorio received 27.4% of the vote and Borja received 27%. Tenorio left office in early 1998.

Controversy

Ties to Tom DeLay and Jack Abramoff

In 1993, the Tenorio administration, concerned that the federal government of the United States might attempt to end the CNMI's exemptions from federal minimum wage laws and federal immigration regulations, thus harming the islands' garment manufacturing industry, hired a firm, Preston Gates, to lobby on its behalf.  Between October 1993 and September 2001, the firm was paid about $6.7 million by the CNMI government, about 72 percent of the government's overall lobbying payments. In 1995, Jack Abramoff, employed at Preston Gates, took on the CNMI as a client.

In October 1996, the contract with Preston Gates expired, but the Tenorio administration broke CNMI laws and continued to pay the firm without a valid contract until Tenorio left office on January 11, 1998. By the end of Tenorio's term, the CNMI government had paid the lobbyists a total of $5.21 million in public funds. The payment without contract was later judged illegal in an investigation by the CNMI Office of the Public Auditor.

In March 1996, March 1997, and October 1997, Abramoff arranged trips to Washington, D.C., for Tenorio and his wife.  There, Tenorio met with Republican leadership in Congress, including Rep. Tom DeLay (R-Texas), Rep. Newt Gingrich (R-Georgia), Rep. Dana Rohrabacher (R-California), and several others. These same congressmen would later lead efforts to extend the CNMI's exemptions from federal minimum wage and immigration laws. On the October 1997 trip Tenorio also met with leaders of the Choctaw tribe in Mississippi, another Abramoff client for whom DeLay manipulated legislation. Around this time, Rohrabacher attacked proponents of subjecting the CNMI to federal minimum wage and immigration laws on the House floor, calling descriptions of the human rights violations going on in the CNMI "nonstop, politically driven attack[s] on the government and people of the Commonwealth of the Northern Mariana Islands."

Abramoff later arranged an all-expenses paid trip to the CNMI capital, Saipan, for Rep. DeLay on New Year's Eve in 1997. Although House ethics rules at the time prohibited House members from accepting such gifts from lobbyists, the trip was funded directly by the CNMI and thus was technically allowable. While visiting the islands, DeLay praised Tenorio, saying, "You represent everything that is good about what we are trying to do in America."
DeLay also attended a reception hosted by Abramoff client Willie Tan of the Tan Holdings Corporation, which had been fined in the past for numerous violations of federal labor laws. Tan, who has been described as "a local powerbroker" in the CNMI, is part of the islands' garment manufacturing industry, notorious for forcing Chinese immigrant workers to live in squalid conditions, work for far less than minimum wage, engage in forced prostitution, and be subjected to forced abortions so they could continue to work.

After the trip, Abramoff helped DeLay craft policy that extended exemptions from federal immigration and minimum-wage labor laws to Saipan industries.  Abramoff also allegedly paid the expenses for at least two other trips to the Marianas. In both cases, Abramoff was reimbursed by Preston Gates, which was then being paid by the Marianas government.

Ultimately, the CNMI ended its relationship with Preston Gates and Jack Abramoff in 2001, years after it was originally ended by Froilan Tenorio's successor, Pedro P. Tenorio, only to have the contract renewed by the commonwealth legislature under the direction of then-Speaker of the House Benigno R. Fitial. After this and other scandals were publicized, Abramoff pleaded guilty to felony charges related to the Jack Abramoff Indian lobbying scandal. Named in the Abramoff scandals and surrounded by associates pleading guilty or facing criminal charges in those scandals, DeLay resigned from the House of Representatives in disgrace in 2006. In 2010, Tenorio maintained that Abramoff "did the job" and deserved his pay.

Executive Order 94-3 and Sonoda v. Cabrera
In June 1994, Governor Tenorio submitted Executive Order 94-3 to the Commonwealth Legislature. The legislature failed to modify or disapprove of the order, thus allowing it to become effective. The order stated:

In December 1995, Tenorio appointed Jose A. Sonoda as Director of the Division of Customs Services within the CNMI government's Department of Finance. Sonoda signed a two-year contract and a "Conditions of Employment" agreement, the latter of which made reference to the fact that government employees would serve at the pleasure of the governor under E.O. 94-3. In March 1996, Sonoda received a letter from the governor's Secretary of Finance, Antonio R. Cabrera, which terminated Sonoda's employment under E.O. 94-3. He was given no cause and no notice. Three days prior to his termination, Sonoda had testified at a legislative hearing; believing that his termination was revenge by the Democratic Governor Tenorio for his apparent Republican leanings in this testimony, Sonoda filed a lawsuit in district court against Cabrera and Tenorio, alleging that they had violated his rights under the United States Constitution to freedom of speech and due process. The district court certified to the Northern Mariana Islands Supreme Court the question of whether Governor Tenorio had violated the CNMI's constitution with E.O. 94-3. In April 1997, the Supreme Court answered that Tenorio had exceeded his executive power, granted under Article III of the CNMI's constitution:

The Supreme Court also ruled that E.O. 94-3 usurped the power to determine which positions were exempt from the civil service system, held exclusively by the CNMI Legislature under Article XX of the CNMI's constitution. For both of these reasons, the Court said it would rule that particular section of E.O. 94-3 to be unconstitutional. Tenorio and Cabrera appealed this decision to the United States Court of Appeals for the Ninth Circuit, which ruled in 1999 that it did not have jurisdiction in the case because it did not involve any federal rights or laws, citing the precedent set in Sablan v. Manglona.

In 2000, the district court denied Sonoda's motion for summary judgment, instead sua sponte granting summary judgment in favor of the defendants, stating that the reason for Sonoda's termination was irrelevant because Tenorio and Cabrera were entitled to qualified immunity as they had reasonable belief that Sonoda could be legally dismissed under E.O. 94-3. In 2001, the U.S. Court of Appeals for the Ninth Circuit reversed this decision, ruling that the defendants were not entitled to qualified immunity:

The appellate court also held that the defendants were not entitled to qualified immunity in the due process claim either, as the Northern Mariana Islands Supreme Court had ruled that only the legislature could make exemptions from the civil service system in Manglona v. Civil Service Commission in 1992, thus making it a well-established precedent by the time Tenorio and Cabrera fired Sonoda. They remanded the case back to the district court to decide on that basis.

Sonoda v. Cabrera, therefore, embroiled Governor Tenorio in a lengthy legal controversy that lasted well beyond the end of his term and ended up striking down one of his executive orders as unconstitutional and stating that, in firing Sonoda, Tenorio had far exceeded his constitutional power.

Tax rebate account shortfall
During the 1997 gubernatorial election, Tenorio was heavily criticized when there were reports of $29 million missing from the CNMI's trust account for tax rebates. Rumors circulated that Tenorio had broken the law in some regard, perhaps by stealing the money. He lost his re-election bid that year. Later the CNMI Department of Finance stated that the $29 million was not missing as only $2 million had ever been deposited; the CNMI legislature had repealed and then reinstated the law requiring that funds be deposited in the account.

Later career
After he lost his bid for re-election, Tenorio repeatedly attempted to return to the governor's office. In 2001, he ran in a four-way race against Borja (running as a Democrat this time), Republican Juan N. Babauta, and Benigno R. Fitial, who was running as the candidate of the new Covenant Party. Rather than running as a Democrat as he had in the past, Tenorio ran as the candidate of the Reform Party, which he had founded in 1999. Tenorio was soundly defeated, and Babauta was elected governor.

In 2005, Tenorio again entered the gubernatorial race, returning to the Democratic Party. After receiving the Democratic nomination, Tenorio finished fourth in a four-way contest, with approximately 18% of the vote. Fitial defeated Heinz S. Hofschneider and Babauta by a very small margin.

In May 2009, Tenorio announced that he had joined the Covenant Party and was allied with Governor Fitial.  Rather than seeking the gubernatorial post again, Tenorio ran for a seat in the Northern Mariana Islands House of Representatives, hoping to represent Precinct 1. Tenorio ran on a platform of increased government investment in tourism, reform of the Commonwealth Utilities Corporation, and economic growth through job creation and increased purchasing power for residents, favoring job creation through new construction projects. He later said in an interview that if elected he would seek to restore the earned income credit, an anti-poverty program implemented by his administration in the 1990s, to increase employment and purchasing power. Tenorio won the election and was subsequently selected for the post of Speaker of the House from 2010–2013, a unique three-year term caused by the 2009 and 2012 change in local elections from odd to even years, 
N.M.I. Const. art. VIII, § 1, but resigned after one year.

See also
 List of Asian Americans and Pacific Islands Americans in the United States Congress

References

External links
National Governors Association biography

|-

|-

|-

1939 births
2020 deaths
Covenant Party (Northern Mariana Islands) politicians
Democratic Party (Northern Mariana Islands) politicians
Democratic Party governors of the Northern Mariana Islands
Democratic Party members of the United States House of Representatives from  the Northern Mariana Islands
Governors of the Northern Mariana Islands
Marquette University alumni
People from Saipan
Resident Representatives of the Northern Mariana Islands
Northern Mariana Islands Senators
University of Guam alumni
Speakers of the Northern Mariana Islands House of Representatives